David Kenny (born 16 November 1962) is a Scottish former professional footballer who played as a winger.

Career
Kenny played for Celtic, Dumbarton, Partick Thistle, Apollon Limassol and APOEL.

References

External links

1962 births
Living people
Scottish footballers
Celtic F.C. players
Dumbarton F.C. players
Partick Thistle F.C. players
Apollon Limassol FC players
APOEL FC players
Scottish Football League players
Cypriot First Division players
Association football wingers
Scottish expatriate footballers
Scottish expatriate sportspeople in Cyprus
Expatriate footballers in Cyprus